John Roland "Big John" Huard (born March 9, 1944) is an American business executive and a former gridiron football player and coach. 
After playing college football at the University of Maine, he played professionally as a linebacker with the Denver Broncos of the American Football League (AFL) from 1967 to 1969, with the New Orleans Saints of the National Football League (NFL) in 1971, with the Montreal Alouettes of the Canadian Football League (CFL) in 1973, and with the CFL's Toronto Argonauts from 1973 to 1975.  Huard served as the head football coach at the Maine Maritime Academy from 1987 to 1993.  He was the head coach of the CFL's Shreveport Pirates in 1994 and the Toronto Argonauts in 2000.

Playing career
Huard played college football at the University of Maine for Black Bears from 1963 to 1966. He was drafted by the Denver Broncos in the fifth round of the 1967 American Football League Draft. He played three seasons for the Broncos before sitting out the 1970 NFL season. In 1971 he returned to the NFL for the New Orleans Saints. After missing all of the 1972 season, Huard signed a five-year contract with the CFL's Montreal Alouettes. He was waived during the 1973 CFL season and claimed by the Toronto Argonauts. He remained in Toronto until his retirement in 1975.

In 2003, Huard was the first player inducted into the "Ring of Honor" at Alfond Stadium and he was elected to the College Football Hall of Fame in 2014.

Coaching career
Huard began coaching in 1974 under Walter Abbott at Maine.  He then became head coach of the Acadia Axemen, winning the Vanier Cup in 1979 and 1981.

Before the 1984 season he was hired by J. I. Albrecht to coach the Atlantic Schooners expansion franchise.  However, the team never played a game and Huard remained at Acadia for one more season before becoming the special teams coach of the Chicago Blitz of the United States Football League (USFL). In 1987, Huard was hired as head football coach of the Maine Maritime Academy. Huard coached the Mariners until 1994 when he was hired by former boss J. I. Albrecht to coach the CFL's expansion Shreveport Pirates. That June he was fired by Pirates President Lonie Glieberman, citing "philosophical differences", and replaced by SMU Athletic Director Forrest Gregg before coaching a single game. Huard and Albrecht later sued the Pirates. Quarterback Billy Joe Tolliver and the City of Shreveport also brought legal action against the team in separate suits. He then served on the coaching staff at Maine's Kents Hill School.

In 2000 he was hired by Albrecht again, this time as head coach of the Toronto Argonauts. His tenure lasted eight games with a record of 1–6–1. He resigned after a 51–4 home loss to the British Columbia Lions.

Huard is now the CEO of Northeast Turf in South Portland, Maine and the northeast representative of FieldTurf. He has donated turf to Acadia University's Raymond Field and University of Maine's Mahaney Dome. He oversaw the installation of FieldTurf at Gillette Stadium during the 2006 NFL season.

Head coaching record

College

CFL

References

External links
 
 

1944 births
Living people
American football linebackers
American players of Canadian football
American sports businesspeople
Canadian football linebackers
Acadia Axemen football coaches
Denver Broncos (AFL) players
Maine Black Bears football coaches
Maine Black Bears football players
Maine Maritime Mariners football coaches
Montreal Alouettes players
New Orleans Saints players
Shreveport Pirates coaches
Toronto Argonauts coaches
Toronto Argonauts players
United States Football League coaches
College Football Hall of Fame inductees
People from Waterville, Maine
Businesspeople from Maine
Coaches of American football from Maine
Players of American football from Maine